The Col du Platzerwasel (elevation ) is a mountain pass situated in the Vosges Mountains in the  Haut-Rhin department of France, between Sondernach and Le Markstein. It has been crossed occasionally during the Tour de France cycle race, including on Stage 10 of the 2014 race.

Details of climb

Tour de France
Including 2014, the col has been crossed three times by the Tour de France.

On the 10th stage of the 2014 Tour de France, Alberto Contador crashed on the descent from the Col du Platzerwasel, breaking his tibia. After riding on for 20 km, he eventually abandoned the Tour.

Tour de France Femmes
The col was used on Stage 7 of the 2022 Tour de France Femmes.

References

Mountain passes of Grand Est
Mountain passes of the Vosges